William Marsden  (16 November 1754 – 6 October 1836) was an Irish orientalist, numismatist, and linguist who served as Second, then First Secretary to the Admiralty during years of conflict with France.

Early life 
Marsden was the son of a Dublin merchant.  He was born in Verval, County Wicklow, and educated at Trinity College, Dublin. Upon obtaining a civil service appointment with the East India Company at sixteen years of age, he was sent to Benkulen, Sumatra, in 1771. He was promoted to the position of principal secretary to the government, and acquired a knowledge of the Malay language and the country. After returning to England in 1779, he was awarded the Doctor of Civil Law (D.C.L.) degree by Oxford University in 1780 and published his History of Sumatra in 1783.

Marsden was elected to membership in the Royal Society in 1783.  He had been recommended by James Rennell, Edward Whitaker Gray, John Topham, Alexander Dalrymple, and Charles Blagden.

Admiralty secretary 
In 1795, Marsden was appointed second secretary to the admiralty, later rising to the position of first secretary with a salary of £4,000 per annum. It was in this capacity in 1805 that he received the news of victory in the Battle of Trafalgar and of the death of Admiral Horatio Nelson in the battle. As first secretary he suggested a system later named Marsden squares for arranging and grouping information over the oceans. He retired in 1807 with a lifetime pension of £1,500 per annum which he subsequently relinquished in 1831. In 1812, he published Grammar and Dictionary of the Malay Language. This was followed by a translation of the Travels of Marco Polo in 1818.

Marsden was a member of many learned societies, and treasurer and vice-president of the Royal Society. In 1820, he was elected as a member to the American Philosophical Society. In 1834 he presented his collection of oriental coins to the British Museum and his library of books and Oriental manuscripts to King's College London. His other works are Catalogue of Dictionaries, Vocabularies, Grammars and Alphabets (1796), Numismata orientalia (London, 1823–1825), and several papers on Eastern topics in the Philosophical Transactions and the Archaeologia.

Marsden's Numismata orientalia opened the field for Asian numismatics in Western languages, and was a "bible" for the subject, so much so that a new edition was planned in 1870s, but the field had grown so much by then that the new series was soon renamed as the International Numismata Orientalia.

He married Elizabeth, the daughter of his friend Sir Charles Wilkins FRS; they had no children. He died on 6 October 1836 from an attack of apoplexy, and was buried at Kensal Green Cemetery. He left his estate to his kinsman Rev. Canon John Howard Marsden. Elizabeth subsequently married Colonel William Leake FRS on 17 September 1838.

In fiction

Marsden is portrayed as a character in Hornblower and the Crisis by C. S. Forester.

Selected works
 1784The history of Sumatra: containing an account of the government, laws, customs and manners of the native inhabitants, with a description of the natural productions, and a relation of the ancient political state of that island. London: Printed for the author. OCLC 3792458
 1802"Observations on the language of Siwah; in a letter to the Rt. Hon. Sir Joseph Banks; by William Marsden, Esq., F.R.S." in The Journal of Frederick Horneman's Travels: From Cairo to Mourzouk, the Capital of the Kingdom of Fezzan, in Africa, by Friedrich Hornemann, James Rennell, William Marsden and William Young.  London: G. and W. Nicol.  
 1796Catalogue of Dictionaries, Vocabularies, Grammars and Alphabets
 1812Grammar and Dictionary of the Malay Language single edition, Dutch & French translation of the Grammar (C. P. J. Elout based on Marsden), Dutch-Malay & French-Malay Dictionary (C. P. J. Elout based on Marsden)
 1818  
 1823Numismata orientalia
 1830Memoirs of a Malayan Family by 'La-uddı̄n Nakhoda Muda (translated by William Marsden). London: Oriental Translation Fund of Great Britain and Ireland. OCLC 5347657
 1838 Brief Memoir of the Life and Writings of the Late William Marsden. London: Cox.

References

External links 

 
 
 
 

1754 births
1836 deaths
Alumni of Trinity College Dublin
18th-century British botanists
English orientalists
Fellows of the Royal Society
People from County Wicklow
Permanent Secretaries to the Admiralty
19th-century British botanists